This is a list of topics related to Yemen.

Yemen
 Yemen
 A New Day in Old Sana'a
 Culture of Yemen
 Greater Yemen

Cities in Yemen

Aden
Ahwar
Al Qasha
Baraqish
Al Bayda', Yemen
Beihan
Ad Dali'
Dhamar, Yemen
Furah
Al Ghaydah
Hadiboh
Hajjah
Al Hudaydah
Ibb
Jibla
Kawkaban
Lahij
Ma'rib
Al Mahwit
Makram
Mocha, Yemen
Mukalla
Mukayras
Nishtun
Qishn
Sa'dah
As Salif
San‘a’
Sayfaf
Seiyun
Shibam
Ash Shihr
Shuqrah
Steroh
Ta'izz
Tarim, Yemen
Thamud, Yemen
Yarim
Zabid
Zinjibar

Communications in Yemen
 Communications in Yemen
 Internet usage in Yemen
 Postage stamps and postal history of Aden
 .ye

Yemeni culture

Yemeni architecture
 Architecture of Yemen

Buildings and structures in Yemen

Dams in Yemen
 Marib Dam

Theatre in Yemen

Yemeni cuisine
 Yemeni cuisine
 Lahoh
 Malooga
 Mandi (food)
 Saltah
 Shafoot
 Fatoot
 Fahsa
 Zhug
 Murtabak

Languages of Yemen
Hadhrami Arabic
Sanaani Arabic
Ta'izzi-Adeni Arabic
Yemenite Hebrew language
Mehri language
Sanaani Hebrew language
Soqotri language
Hobyót language

Literature of Yemen
 Lost in a Fairy Tale

Yemeni music
 Music of Yemen
 National anthem of Yemen

Economy of Yemen
 Economy of Yemen
 Water supply and sanitation in Yemen
 Yemeni buqsha
 Yemeni rial
 Yemenia

Trade unions of Yemen
 Yemeni Confederation of Labor Unions

Education in Yemen
 Sheikh Abdul Majeed al-Zindani

Schools in Yemen
 Sanaa International School

Universities and colleges in Yemen
 University of Aden
 Lebanese International University

Yemeni Organizations Outside Yemen
 AAYSP

Environment of Yemen

Conservation in Yemen

World Heritage Sites in Yemen
 San‘a’
 Shibam
 Zabid

Geography of Yemen
 Geography of Yemen
 Bab-el-Mandeb
 Gulf of Aden
 Hadhramaut
 ISO 3166-2:YE
 Lower Yemen
 Bab Iskender
 Ras Menheli
 Saudi-Yemen barrier
 Tihamah
 Upper Yemen

Islands of Yemen
 Hanish Islands
 Kamaran
 Perim
 Socotra

Maps of Yemen

Mountains of Yemen
 Jabal an Nabi Shu'ayb

Volcanoes of Yemen
 Jabal al-Tair

Yemen geography stubs
 'Adan Governorate
 'Amran Governorate
 Abyan Governorate
 Ad Dali'
 Ad Dali' Governorate
 Aden (colony)
 Ahwar
 Al Batinah, Yemen
 Al Bayda' Governorate
 Al Bayda', Yemen
 Al Ghaydah
 Al Hudaydah
 Al Hudaydah Governorate
 Al Jawf Governorate
 Al Mahrah Governorate
 Al Mahwit
 Al Mahwit Governorate
 Al Marqab, Yemen
 Mukalla
 Al Qasha
 Alawi (sheikhdom)
 Aqrabi
 As Salif
 Ash Shihr
 Audhali
 Bab Iskender
 Baraqish
 Cheikh Saïd
 Dathina
 Dhamar, Yemen
 Emirate of Beihan
 Emirate of Dhala
 Fadhli Sultanate
 Federation of Arab Emirates of the South
 Furah
 Gulf of Aden
 Hadhramaut Governorate
 Hadiboh
 Hajjah
 Hajjah Governorate
 Hanish Islands
 Haushabi Sultanate
 Havilah
 Himyar
 Ibb
 Jabal an Nabi Shu'ayb
 Jibla
 Kamaran
 Kathiri
 Kawkaban
 Lahej Sultanate
 Lahij
 Lahij Governorate
 Lower Aulaqi
 Lower Yafa
 Lower Yemen
 Ma'rib
 Ma'rib Governorate
 Maflahi
 Mahra Sultanate
 Makram
 Mukayras
 Nishtun
 Protectorate of South Arabia
 Qishn
 Qu'aiti
 Radfan
 Ras Menheli
 Raymah Governorate
 Sa'dah
 Sa'dah Governorate
 San‘a’ Governorate
 Sayfaf
 Seiyun
 Shabwah Governorate
 Shaib
 Shibam
 Shuqrah
 Steroh
 Subeihi Sultanate
 Ta'izz
 Tarim, Yemen
 Template:Yemen-geo-stub
 Thamud, Yemen
 Tihamah
 Timna
 United Arab States
 Upper Aulaqi Sheikhdom
 Upper Aulaqi Sultanate
 Upper Yafa
 Upper Yemen
 Wahidi Balhaf
 Wahidi Bir Ali
 Wahidi Haban
 Yarim
 Zabid
 Zafar
 Zinjibar
 Zuqar Island

Yemeni society
 Demographics of Yemen
 Yemen Scouts and Guides Association

 Chaush - Yemeni community in Hyderabad

Arab Tribes of Yemen
 Qahtanite
 Kindah
 Ba'Alawi
 Banu Tamim

Government of Yemen
 Assembly of Representatives of Yemen
 Foreign relations of Yemen
 Human rights in Yemen
 President of People's Democratic Republic of Yemen
 President of Yemen Arab Republic
 List of presidents of Yemen
 Prime Minister of South Yemen
 Prime Minister of Yemen
 Prime Minister of Yemen Arab Republic
 Wahiba Fara’a
 Deputy Prime Minister for Economic Affairs of Yemen

Foreign relations of Yemen

Governorates of Yemen
 Governorates of Yemen
 Abyan Governorate
 Ad Dali' Governorate
 'Adan Governorate
 Al Bayda' Governorate
 Al Hudaydah Governorate
 Al Jawf Governorate
 Al Mahrah Governorate
 Al Mahwit Governorate
 'Amran Governorate
 Dhamar Governorate
 Hadhramaut Governorate
 Hajjah Governorate
 Ibb Governorate
 Lahij Governorate
 Ma'rib Governorate
 Raymah Governorate
 Sa'dah Governorate
 San‘a’
 San‘a’ Governorate
 Shabwah Governorate
 Ta'izz Governorate
 Template:Governorates of Yemen

History of Yemen
 History of Yemen
 Aden (colony)
 Aden Protectorate
 Adnan
 Al-Hurra Al-Malika
 Alawi (sheikhdom)
 Ancient history of Yemen
 Aqrabi
 Audhali
 Cheikh Saïd
 Corrective Revolution
 Dathina
 Democratic Republic of Yemen
 Dhu Nuwas
 Emblem of Yemen
 Emirate of Beihan
 Emirate of Dhala
 Fadhli Sultanate
 Federation of Arab Emirates of the South
 Federation of South Arabia
 Flag of Yemen
 Greater Yemen
 Hadhramaut
 Haushabi Sultanate
 Himyar
 Imams of Yemen
 Islamic history of Yemen
 Kathiri
 Kingdom of Awsan
 Lahej Sultanate
 List of rulers of Saba and Himyar
 Lower Aulaqi
 Lower Yafa
 Maflahi
 Mahra Sultanate
 Marib Dam
 Maritime Jewel
 Minaeans
 Modern history of Yemen
 Mutawakkilite Kingdom of Yemen
 North Yemen Civil War
 People's Democratic Republic of Yemen
 Postage stamps and postal history of Aden
 President of People's Democratic Republic of Yemen
 President of Yemen Arab Republic
 List of Presidents of Yemen
 Prime Minister of South Yemen
 Prime Minister of Yemen
 Prime Minister of Yemen Arab Republic
 Protectorate of South Arabia
 Qahtanite
 Qu'aiti
 Qutaibi
 Radfan
 Sabaean language
 Sabaeans
 Sanaa massacre
 September 15th, 2006 Yemen attacks
 Shaib
 South Arabian alphabet
 South Yemen
 South Yemeni dinar
 Subeihi Sultanate
 Terrorism in Yemen
 Timeline of Yemeni history
 Treaty of Jeddah (2000)
 USS Cole bombing
 United Nations Yemen Observation Mission
 Upper Aulaqi Sheikhdom
 Upper Aulaqi Sultanate
 Upper Yafa
 Wahidi Balhaf
 Wahidi Bir Ali
 Wahidi Haban
 Yemen Arab Republic
 Yemeni buqsha
 Yemeni unification
 Ziyadid dynasty

Archaeological sites in Yemen
 Ma'rib
 Marib Dam
 Timna

Elections in Yemen
 Elections in Yemen
 Yemeni presidential election, 2006

Maps of the history of Yemen

School massacres in Yemen
 Sanaa massacre

Terrorism in Yemen
 September 15, 2006 Yemen attacks
 2010 cargo plane bomb plot

Wars involving Yemen
 Saudi–Yemeni War
 1948 Arab–Israeli War
 North Yemen Civil War
 Hanish Islands conflict

Years in Yemen

2006 in Yemen
 Yemen at the 2006 Asian Games
 Yemeni presidential election, 2006

Yemeni law

Crime in Yemen

Yemeni media

Newspapers published in Yemen
 Al-Ayyam (Yemen)
 Shabab Yemeni
 Yemen Observer
 Yemen Times

Military of Yemen
 Military of Yemen
 Yemen Air Force

Organizations based in Yemen
 Dofar Liberation Front

Yemeni people
 List of Yemenis
 Allal Ab Aljallil Abd Al Rahman Abd
 Abd al-Aziz ibn Musa
 Abdel Ghalib Ahmad Hakim
 Abdul Aziz bin Hars bin Asad Yemeni Tamimi
 Abdul Rahman Mohamed Saleh Naser
 Abu Al Fazal Abdul Wahid Yemeni Tamimi
 Abu Bakr Ibn Ali Muhhammad Alahdal
 Ahmed Umar Abdullah al Hikimi
 Faruq Ali Ahmed
 Fayad Yahya Ahmed
 Muhammad Ahmad Abdallah Al Ansi
 Mohammed Ahmed Ali Al Asadi
 Saad Masir Mukbl Al Azani
 Ali Hamza Ahmed Sulayman al Bahlul
 Ghaleb Nassar Al Bihani
 Adil Said Al Haj Obeid Al Busayss
 Atag Ali Abdoh Al-Haj
 Al Hamdani
 Abdul Al Salam Al Hilal
 Al Khadr Abdallah Muhammed Al Yafi
 Mahmoud Abd Al Aziz Abd Al Mujahid
 Ali Yahya Mahdi Al Raimi
 Mashur Abdallah Muqbil Ahmed Al Sabri
 Hani Abdul Muslih al Shulan
 Abdul Aziz Abdullah Ali Al Suadi
 Muktar Yahya Najee Al Warafi
 Abdullah Al-Baradouni
 Muhammed al-Darbi
 Muhammad al-Gharsi
 Omar Ahmad Omar al-Hubishi
 Al-Khayzuran
 Issam Ahmad Dibwan al-Makhlafi
 Samir Abduh Sa'id al-Maktawi
 Bashir Nashir Al-Marwalah
 Bassam Abdullah bin Bushar al-Nahdi
 Mohammad Ahman al-Naziri
 Fahd al-Quso
 Fawaz al-Rabeiee
 Abd Al-Rahman Ali Al-Jifri
 Abdullah Al-Rimi
 Shuhour Abdullah Mukbil al-Sabri
 Bashir Ali Nasser al-Sharari
 Alyan Muhammad Ali al-Wa'eli
 Ammar Abadah Nasser al-Wa'eli
 Amin Saad Muhammad al-Zumari
 Ahmad al-Akhader Nasser Albidani
 Naji Al Ashwal
 Ayoub Murshid Ali Saleh
 Azd
 Banu Lakhm
 Jalal Salam Bin Amer
 Hassan Mohammed Ali Bin Attash
 Ramzi bin al-Shibh
 Ghassanids
 Fahed Abdullah Ahmad Ghazi
 Salem Ahmed Hadi
 Salim Ahmed Hamdan
 Hamdani
 Harbi al-Himyari
 Abu Ali al-Harithi
 Hashid
 Emad Abdalla Hassan
 Fadil Husayn Salih Hintif
 Bader Ben Hirsi
 Ibrahim Othman Ibrahim Idris
 Idris Ahmed Abdu Qader Idris
 Sadeq Muhammad Sa'id Ismail
 Khalid Mohammed Salih Al Dhuby
 Karama Khamis
 Karam Khamis Sayd Khamsan
 Rizwan Khan
 Lakhmids
 Mahmoud Omar Mohammed Bin Atef
 Jamal Muhammad Alawi Mar'i
 Muaz Hamza Ahmad Al Alawi
 Muhhammad Said Bin Salem
 Musa bin Nusair
 Sa id Salih Sa id Nashir
 Nethanel ben Isaiah
 Abdulaziz Muhammad Saleh bin Otash
 Qahtanite
 Khaled Qasim
 Rabiah ibn Mudhar
 Sabaeans
 Said Muhammed Salih Hatim
 Sharifa Fatima
 Shawki Awad Balzuhair
 Sheikh Abdul Majeed al-Zindani
 Riyadh Shikawi
 Abdul Rahman Abdul Abu Ghiyth Sulayman
 Tarek Ali Abdullah Ahmed Baada
 Ayoob Tarish
 Toufiq Saber Muhammad Al Marwa’i
 Waddah al-Yaman
 Haitham al-Yemeni
 Zahar Omar Hamis Bin Hamdoun
 Walid Said Bin Said Zaid
 Abdulrab Muhammad Muhammad Ali al-Sayfi

Yemeni extrajudicial prisoners of the United States
 Abdul Aziz Abdullah Ali Al Suadi
 Abu Bakr Ibn Ali Muhhammad Alahdal
 Ahmed Umar Abdullah al Hikimi
 Ali Abdullah Ahmed
 Fahmi Abdullah Ahmed
 Faruq Ali Ahmed
 Fayad Yahya Ahmed
 Muhammad Ahmad Abdallah Al Ansi
 Mohammed Ahmed Ali Al Asadi
 Saad Masir Mukbl Al Azani
 Ghaleb Nassar Al Bihani
 Mohammed Ahmad Said Al Edah
 Atag Ali Abdoh Al-Haj
 Mohammed Abdullah Al Hamiri
 Mohammad Ahmed Abdullah Saleh Al Hanashi
 Abdul Al Salam Al Hilal
 Issam Hamid Al Bin Ali Al Jayfi
 Asim Thahit Abdullah Al Khalaqi
 Ha Il Aziz Ahmed Al Maythali
 Musab Omar Ali Al Mudwani
 Mahmoud Abd Al Aziz Abd Al Mujahid
 Nasir Najr Nasir Balud Al Mutayri
 Sulaiman Awath Sulaiman Bin Ageel Al Nahdi
 Khalid Abd Jal Jabbar Muhammad Juthman Al Qadasi
 Sabri Mohammed Ebrahim Al Qurashi
 Abdul Rahman Umir Al Qyati
 Riyad Atiq Ali Abdu Al Haj Al Radai
 Ali Ahmad Muhammad Al Rahizi
 Ali Yahya Mahdi Al Raimi
 Mashur Abdallah Muqbil Ahmed Al Sabri
 Abdul Al Saleh
 Fahmi Salem Said Al Sani
 Mustafa Abdul Qawi Abdul Aziz Al Shamyri
 Hani Abdul Muslih al Shulan
 Ali Husayn Abdullah Al Tays
 Hamoud Abdullah Hamoud Hassan Al Wady
 Abd al Malik Abd al Wahab
 Muktar Yahya Najee Al Warafi
 Mohammed Ali Salem Al Zarnuki
 Saleh Mohamed Al Zuba
 Muhammed al-Darbi
 Sanad Ali Yislam Al-Kazimi
 Abdulah Alhamiri
 Ayoub Murshid Ali Saleh
 Yasim Muhammed Basardah
 Jalal Salam Bin Amer
 Hassan Mohammed Ali Bin Attash
 Mohammed Ali Abdullah Bwazir
 Fahed Abdullah Ahmad Ghazi
 Salem Ahmed Hadi
 Mohammed Ahmed Said Haidel
 Abdel Ghalib Ahmad Hakim
 Salim Ahmed Hamdan
 Mohammed Mohammed Hassen
 Said Muhammed Salih Hatim
 Fadil Husayn Salih Hintif
 Ibrahim Othman Ibrahim Idris
 Idris Ahmed Abdu Qader Idris
 Sadeq Muhammad Sa'id Ismail
 Yasin Qasem Muhammad Ismail
 Khalid Mohammed Salih Al Dhuby
 Karam Khamis Sayd Khamsan
 Mohammed Nasir Yahya Khusruf
 Ahmed Yaslam Said Kuman
 Fawaz Naman Hamoud Abdallah Mahdi
 Mahmoud Omar Mohammed Bin Atef
 Jamal Muhammad Alawi Mar'i
 Sharaf Ahmad Muhammad Masud
 Hussein Salem Mohammed
 Samir Naji Al Hasan Moqbel
 Muhsin Muhammad Musheen Moqbill
 Muaz Hamza Ahmad Al Alawi
 Muhhammad Said Bin Salem
 Abdul Rahman Mohamed Saleh Naser
 Sa id Salih Sa id Nashir
 Ahmed Abdul Qader
 Khaled Qasim
 Salman Yahya Hassan Mohammed Rabeii
 Mohammed Ahmed Salam
 Shawki Awad Balzuhair
 Abdul Rahman Abdul Abu Ghiyth Sulayman
 Mohmmad Ahmad Ali Tahar
 Tarek Ali Abdullah Ahmed Baada
 Toufiq Saber Muhammad Al Marwa’i
 Uthman Abdul Rahim Mohammed Uthman
 Zahar Omar Hamis Bin Hamdoun
 Walid Said Bin Said Zaid
 Mohammed H. Al-Shatri

Yemenite Jews
 Yemenite Jews
 Yemenite Hebrew language
 Zohar Argov
 Daklon
 Shoshana Damari
 Dhu Nuwas
 Dor Daim
 Zion Golan
 Ofra Haza
 Jacob ben Nathanael
 Kerem Hatemanim
 Kiryat Netafim
 Operation Magic Carpet (Yemen)
 Sanaani Hebrew language
 Shalom Shabazi
 Shalom Sharabi
 Amnon Yitzhak
 Yosef Qafih

Yemeni murder victims

Assassinated Yemeni people

Yemeni politicians
 Hamid al-Ahmar
 Abdulkarim Al-Arhabi
 Mohsin Ahmad al-Aini
 Muhammad Said al-Attar
 Abdul Karim al-Iryani
 Hassan al-Amri
 Haidar Abu Bakr al-Attas
 Ali Salim al-Baidh
 Abdul Qadir Bajamal
 Faraj Said Bin Ghanem
 Ahmad bin Yahya
 Abdul Latif Dayfallah
 Dhu Nuwas
 Mahmoud al-Gayifi
 Abdul Aziz Abdul Ghani
 Kadhi Abdullah al-Hagri
 Muhammad Ali Haitham
 Abdul Rahman al-Iryani
 Abdullah Kurshumi
 Hassan Muhammad Makki
 Muhammad al-Badr
 Yasin Said Numan
 Ahmad Muhammad Numan
 Jarallah Omar
 List of Presidents of Yemen
 Prime Minister of South Yemen
 Prime Minister of Yemen
 Deputy Prime Minister of Yemen
 Prime Minister of Yemen Arab Republic
 AbdulWahab Raweh
 Abdul Salam Sabrah
 Ali Abdullah Saleh
 Abdullah as-Sallal
 Faysal al-Shaabi
 Faisal Bin Shamlan
 Sheikh Abdul Majeed al-Zindani
 Wahiba Fara’a
 Yahya Muhammad Hamid ed-Din

Assassinated Yemeni politicians
 Ahmad al-Ghashmi
 Kadhi Abdullah al-Hagri
 Yahya Muhammad Hamid ed-Din

Presidents of North Yemen
 President of Yemen Arab Republic
 Ahmad al-Ghashmi
 Ibrahim al-Hamadi
 Abdul Karim Abdullah al-Arashi
 Abdul Rahman al-Iryani
 Ali Abdullah Saleh
 Abdullah as-Sallal

Presidents of South Yemen
 President of People's Democratic Republic of Yemen
 Haidar Abu Bakr al-Attas
 Abdul Fattah Ismail
 Ali Nasir Muhammad
 Salim Ali Rubai
 Qahtan Mohammed al-Shaabi

Rulers of Yemen
 Arwa al-Sulayhi
 Ali Abdullah Saleh

Yemeni economists
 Abdulaziz Al-Saqqaf

Yemeni people stubs
 Template:Yemen-bio-stub
 Abd al-Aziz ibn Musa
 Abdul Aziz Abdul Ghani
 Abdul Karim Abdullah al-Arashi
 Abdul Karim al-Iryani
 Abdul Latif Dayfallah
 Abdul Qadir Bajamal
 Abdul Rahman al-Iryani
 Abdul Salam Sabrah
 AbdulWahab Raweh
 Abdulaziz Al-Saqqaf
 Abdullah Al-Baradouni
 Abdullah Kurshumi
 Abdullah as-Sallal
 Abu Ali al-Harithi
 Ageel bin Muhammad al-Badr
 Ahmad Muhammad Numan
 Ahmad al-Ghashmi
 Al-Khayzuran
 Ali Nasir Muhammad
 Ali Salim al-Baidh
 Amnon Yitzhak
 Ayoob Tarish
 Faraj Said Bin Ghanem
 Faysal al-Shaabi
 Haidar Abu Bakr al-Attas
 Haitham al-Yemeni
 Harbi al-Himyari
 Hassan Muhammad Makki
 Hassan al-Amri
 Ibrahim al-Hamadi
 Jacob ben Nathanael
 Kadhi Abdullah al-Hagri
 Karama Khamis
 Mahmoud al-Gayifi
 Mohammad Ahman al-Naziri
 Mohsin Ahmad al-Aini
 Muhammad Ali Haitham
 Muhammad Assad
 Muhammad Said al-Attar
 Muhammad al-Gharsi
 Naji Al Ashwal
 Qahtan Mohammed al-Shaabi
 Rabiah ibn Mudhar
 Rosa Mustafa Abdulkhaleq
 Said Muhammed Salih Hatim
 Salim Ali Rubai
 Samir Naji Al Hasan Moqbel
 Sharifa Fatima
 Sheikh Abdul Majeed al-Zindani
 Wahiba Fara’a
 Yasin Said Numan
 Abdullah Muhammad AlKathiri

Politics of Yemen
 Politics of Yemen
 Assembly of Representatives of Yemen
 Dofar Liberation Front
 Emblem of Yemen
 Flag of Yemen
 Foreign relations of Yemen
 Human rights in Yemen
 National anthem of Yemen
 Steadfastness and Confrontation Front
 Wahiba Fara’a

Political parties in Yemen
 List of political parties in Yemen
 Arab Socialist Rebirth Party (Yemen)
 Baath Party
 General People's Congress
 Nasserite Unionist People's Organisation
 Yemeni Congregation for Reform
 Yemeni Socialist Party

Religion in Yemen
 Islam in Yemen
 Roman Catholicism in Yemen

Zaydi
 Zaidiyyah

Zaydis
 Muhammad ash-Shawkani

Science and Technology in Yemen
 Internet in Yemen

Sport in Yemen
 Yemen at the 2006 Asian Games
 Yemen at the Commonwealth Games

Football in Yemen
 South Yemen national football team
 Yemen Football Association
 Yemen national football team

Yemeni football clubs
 Al Yarmuk Al Rawda
 Al-Ahli (San'a')
 Al-Hilal (Al Hudaydah)
 Hassan (Yemen football club)
 Al-Saqr
 Al-Sha'ab Hadramaut
 Al-Tilal

Yemeni football competitions
 Yemeni League

Football venues in Yemen
 Ali Muhesen Stadium
 Althawra Sports City Stadium
 Baradem Mukalla Stadium
 May 22 Stadium

Yemen at the Olympics
 North Yemen at the 1984 Summer Olympics
 North Yemen at the 1988 Summer Olympics
 South Yemen at the 1988 Summer Olympics
 Yemen at the 1992 Summer Olympics
 Yemen at the 1996 Summer Olympics
 Yemen at the 2000 Summer Olympics
 Yemen at the 2004 Summer Olympics

Transport and travel in Yemen
 Transport in Yemen
Visa requirements for Yemeni citizens

Aviation in Yemen
 Rosa Mustafa Abdulkhaleq
 Yemen Air Force
 Yemenia

Airports in Yemen
 Al Ghaydah Airport
 Sana'a International Airport
 Ta'izz International Airport

Yemen stubs
 Template:Yemen-stub
 .ye
 Aden-Abyan Islamic Army
 Al Yarmuk Al Rawda
 Al-Ahli (San'a')
 Al-Hilal (Al Hudaydah)
 Al-Saqr
 Al-Sha'ab Hadramaut
 Al-Tilal
 Ali Muhesen Stadium
 Althawra Sports City Stadium
 Arab Socialist Rebirth Party (Yemen)
 Assembly of Representatives of Yemen
 Azd
 Baradem Mukalla Stadium
 Communications in Yemen
 Culture of Yemen
 Democratic Republic of Yemen
 Elections in Yemen
 Emblem of Yemen
 Flag of Yemen
 General People's Congress
 Hashid
 Hassan (Yemen football club)
 Jachnun
 List of Presidents of Yemen
 List of newspapers in Yemen
 Mandi (food)
 May 22 Stadium
 Mehri people
 Mehri language
 Military of Yemen
 Minaeans
 Mudhaffar
 Music of Yemen
 Nasserite Unionist People's Organisation
 North Yemen Civil War
 North Yemen at the 1984 Summer Olympics
 North Yemen at the 1988 Summer Olympics
 Operation Magic Carpet (Yemen)
 Postage stamps and postal history of Aden
 President of People's Democratic Republic of Yemen
 President of Yemen Arab Republic
 Prime Minister of South Yemen
 Prime Minister of Yemen
 Prime Minister of Yemen Arab Republic
 Qahtanite
 Qutaibi
 Roman Catholicism in Yemen
 Sabaean language
 Sabaeans
 Sanaa International School
 Sanaa massacre
 Sanaani Hebrew language
 Saudi-Yemeni War
 Shabab Yemeni
 Soqotri language
 South Arabian alphabet
 South Yemen
 South Yemen at the 1988 Summer Olympics
 South Yemen national football team
 South Yemeni dinar
 Transport in Yemen
 United Nations Yemen Observation Mission
 Yemen Times
 Yemen at the 1992 Summer Olympics
 Yemen at the 1996 Summer Olympics
 Yemen at the 2000 Summer Olympics
 Yemen at the 2004 Summer Olympics
 Yemen at the 2006 Asian Games
 Yemen at the Commonwealth Games
 Yemen national football team
 Yemeni Confederation of Labor Unions
 Yemeni Congregation for Reform
 Yemeni buqsha
 Yemeni rial
 Yemenia
 Yemenite Hebrew language
 Ziyadid dynasty

See also
 Lists of country-related topics - similar lists for other countries

 
Outlines of countries